Richard Le Gallienne (20 January 1866 – 15 September 1947) was an English author and poet. The British-American actress Eva Le Gallienne (1899–1991) was his daughter by his second marriage to Danish journalist Julie Nørregaard (1863–1942).

Life and career
He was born Richard Thomas Gallienne in Liverpool, England, to a middle-class family. He attended the (then) all boys public school Liverpool College. After leaving school he changed his name to Le Gallienne and started work in an accountant's office in London. In 1883, his father took him to a lecture by Oscar Wilde in Birkenhead. He soon abandoned this job to become a professional writer with ambitions of being a poet. His book My Ladies' Sonnets appeared in 1887, and in 1889 he became, for a brief time, literary secretary to Wilson Barrett. In the summer of 1888 he met Wilde, and the two had a brief affair. Le Gallienne and Wilde continued an intimate correspondence after the end of the affair.

He joined the staff of the newspaper The Star in 1891 and wrote for various papers under the name Logroller. He contributed to The Yellow Book, and associated with the Rhymers' Club.

His first wife, Mildred Lee, and their second daughter, Maria, died in 1894 during childbirth, leaving behind Richard and their daughter Hesper Joyce. After Mildred's death he carried with him at all times, including while married to his second wife, an urn containing Mildred's ashes. Rupert Brooke, who met Le Gallienne in 1913 aboard a ship bound for the United States but did not warm to him, wrote a short poem "For Mildred's Urn" satirising this behaviour.

In 1897 he married the Danish journalist Julie Nørregaard. She became stepmother to Hesper, and their daughter Eva was born 11 January 1899. In 1901 and 1902, he was a writer for The Rambler, a magazine produced by Herbert Vivian intended to be a revival of Samuel Johnson's periodical of the same name.

In 1903 Nørregaard left Richard, taking both of his daughters to live in Paris. Nørregaard later sent Hesper to live with her paternal grandparents in an affluent part of London while Eva remained with her mother. Julie later cited his inability to provide a stable home or pay his debts, alcoholism, and womanising as grounds for divorce. Their daughter Eva would grow up to take on some of her father's negative traits, including womanising and heavy drinking.

Le Gallienne subsequently became a resident of the United States. He has been credited with the 1906 translation from the Danish of Peter Nansen's Love's Trilogy, but most sources and the book itself attribute it to Julie. They were divorced in June 1911. On 27 October 1911, he married Mrs. Irma Perry (née Hinton), whose previous marriage to her first cousin, the painter and sculptor Roland Hinton Perry, had been dissolved in 1904. Le Gallienne and Irma had known each other for some time and had jointly published an article as early as 1906. Irma's daughter Gwendolyn Hinton Perry subsequently called herself "Gwen Le Gallienne" but was almost certainly not his natural daughter, having been born circa 1898.

From the late 1920s, Le Gallienne and Irma lived in Paris, where Gwen was by then an established figure in the expatriate bohème and where he wrote a regular newspaper column.

Le Gallienne lived in Menton on the French Riviera during the 1940s. During the Second World War he was prevented from returning to his Menton home and lived in Monaco for the rest of the war. His house in Menton was occupied by German troops and his library was nearly sent back to Germany as bounty. Le Gallienne appealed to a German officer in Monaco, who allowed him to return to Menton to collect his books. During the war Le Gallienne refused to write propaganda for the local German and Italian authorities and, with no income, once collapsed in the street owing to hunger.

In later times he knew Llewelyn Powys and John Cowper Powys.

Asked how to say his name, he told The Literary Digest the stress was "on the last syllable: le gal-i-enn'. As a rule I hear it pronounced as if it were spelled 'gallion,' which, of course, is wrong." (Charles Earle Funk, What's the Name, Please?, Funk & Wagnalls, 1936.)

A number of his works are now available online.

He also wrote the foreword to "The Days I Knew" by Lillie Langtry 1925, George H. Doran Company on Murray Hill New York.

Le Gallienne is buried in Menton in a grave whose lease (license No. 738 / B Extension of the Trabuquet Cemetery) does not expire until 2023.

Exhibitions
In 2016 an exhibition on the life and works of Richard Le Gallienne was held at the central library in his home city of Liverpool, England. Entitled "Richard Le Gallienne: Liverpool's Wild(e) Poet", it featured his affair with Oscar Wilde, his famous actress daughter Eva Le Gallienne and his personal ties to the city. The exhibition ran for six weeks between August and October 2016, and a talk about him was held at the Victorian Literary Symposium during Liverpool's Literary festival the same year.

Works

My Ladies' Sonnets and Other Vain and Amatorious Verses (1887) 
Volumes in Folio (1889) poems
George Meredith: Some Characteristics (1890) 
The Student and the Body Snatcher and Other Trifles with Robinson K. Leather (1890)
The Book-Bills of Narcissus (1891)
English Poems (1892) 
The Religion of a Literary Man (1893) 
Robert Louis Stevenson: An Elegy and Other Poems (1895) 
The Quest of the Golden Girl (1896) novel
Prose Fancies (1896)
Retrospective Reviews (1896) 
Rubaiyat of Omar Khayyam (1897) translation
If I Were God (1897) 
The Romance of Zion Chapel (1898)
In Praise of Bishop Valentine (1898) 
Young Lives (1899) 
Sleeping Beauty and Other Prose Fancies (1900) 
The Worshipper of the Image (1900)
Travels in England (1900)
The Love Letters of the King, or The Life Romantic (1901) 
An Old Country House (1902) 
Odes from the Divan of Hafiz (1903) translation
Old Love Stories Retold (1904) 
Painted Shadows (1904) 
Romances of Old France (1905) 
Little Dinners with the Sphinx and other Prose Fancies (1907)
Omar Repentant (1908) 
Wagner's Tristan and Isolde (1909) translation
Attitudes and Avowals (1910) essays
October Vagabonds (1910)
New Poems (1910)
The Loves of the Poets (1911)
The Maker of Rainbows and Other Fairy-Tales and Fables (1912) 
The Lonely Dancer and Other Poems (1913) 
The Highway to Happiness (1913)
Vanishing Roads and Other Essays (1915)
The Silk-Hat Soldier and Other Poems in War Time (1915)
The Chain Invisible (1916) 
Pieces of Eight (1918) 
The Junk-Man and Other Poems (1920) 
The Diary of Samuel Pepys (1921) editor
A Jongleur Strayed (1922) poems
Woodstock: An Essay (1923) 
The Romantic '90s (1925) memoirs
The Romance of Perfume (1928) 
There Was a Ship (1930) 
From a Paris Garret (1936) memoirs

Notes

References
The Quest of the Golden Boy: : The Life and Letters of Richard Le Gallienne (1960) Geoffrey Smerdon and Richard Whittington-Egan
Richard Le Gallienne: A Centenary Memoir-Anthology (1966) Clarence Decker

"Richard Le Gallienne: A Bibliography of Writings About Him" (1976) Wendell Harris and Rebecca Larsen, English Literature in Transition (1880–1920), vol. 19, no. 2 (1976): 111–32.
"Decadence and the Major Poetical Works of Richard Le Gallienne" (1978) Maria F. Gonzalez, Unpublished PhD Thesis, University of Miami
"Le Gallienne's Paraphrase and the limits of translation" (2011) Adam Talib in FitzGerald’s Rubáiyát of Omar Khayyám: Popularity and Neglect, edited by Adrian Poole, Christine van Ruymbeke, William H. Martin and Sandra Mason, London: Anthem Press 2011, pp. 175–92.
M.G.H. Pittock, "Richard Thomas Le Gallienne", in Oxford Dictionary of National Biography, (c) Oxford University Press 2004–2014

External links

 
 
 
 The Yellow Nineties Online (Richard Le Gallienne)
 Brief article on Richard Le Gallienne in May 1895 edition of The Bookman (New York)

1866 births
1947 deaths
English expatriates in France
English expatriates in Monaco
English people of French descent
Poets from Liverpool
Translators of Omar Khayyám
Writers from Liverpool
English male poets
People educated at Liverpool College